Group B of the 1995 King Fahd Cup took place between 6 and 10 January 1995. Argentina won the group on goal difference, and advanced to the final, while Nigeria finished second and advanced to third-place playoff. Japan failed to advance.

Standings

Results

Japan v Nigeria

Japan v Argentina

Nigeria v Argentina

References

B
1994–95 in Argentine football
1994–95 in Nigerian football
1995 in Japanese football